Terror Jr is an American pop duo formed in 2016 founded by former The Cataracs band member David "Campa" Benjamin Singer-Vine, Lisa Vitale, and Felix Snow, who left the group in late 2017. Their single "Come First" peaked at number 10 on the Billboard Spotify Velocity chart, number 6 on the Billboard Hot Dance/Electronic songs chart, number 54 in the Czech Republic, and number 59 in Slovakia.

Background
Members Felix Snow and David "Campa" Benjamin Singer-Vine met through Twitter in 2014 and first worked together on a project called Momma, releasing a 4 track EP. They reconnected the following year working with singer Kiiara on her single "Gold". In 2016, they started Terror Jr as a "social experiment", with Singer-Vine adding "It's a puzzle, and we're gonna give out pieces with each song."<ref name="LA weekly" / The group released their debut extended play Bop City on October 21, 2016.

In November 2016, Kylie Jenner was rumored to be the lead singer of Terror Jr. Jenner denied being a part of the group in a Snapchat post on November 9, 2016.

Terror Jr released the song "Heartbreaks" through their YouTube channel on November 24, 2016. On February 14, 2017, the group released a remix package of "Come First".

In May 2017, the group released "Caramel" and "Death Wish" as the first two songs from Bop City 2: TerroRising, released on June 16, 2017.

On September 8, 2017, Terror Jr released a new single "Holding Your Tongue". The single was quickly followed by the announcement of the group's third LP, Bop City 3: The Girl Who Cried Purple, released September 29, 2017. They released the song "Sad Sad Girl" in December 2017.

In 2018, they released the singles "Heaven Wasn't Made For Me" and "A-OK (Everything's Perfect)".

Their debut album Unfortunately, Terror Jr was released on January 25, 2019. That same year, the duo departed Atlantic Records. On October 4, they released the single "9 2 5". On November 8, 2019, the group released the EP Come Outside and Break Your Heart, their first release under their own label, Grape Music. On November 13, 2020, they released the EP Bloody Waters. Three days later, they announced on their social media that their upcoming album, Rancho Catastrophe, would be released later that week on November 20.

Discography

Albums

Extended plays

Singles

External links
 Official website

References

American pop music groups
Musical groups established in 2016
Atlantic Records artists
2016 establishments in the United States